The Bald Knob National Wildlife Refuge is a  (2014) wildlife refuge located in White County, Arkansas about two miles south of the town of Bald Knob. The refuge is managed by the United States Fish and Wildlife Service.  The refuge features large numbers of migratory waterfowl and bald eagles during the winter months.

The Bald Knob National Wildlife Refuge was established in 1993 when the U.S. government purchased a large rice farm from the John Hancock Insurance Company. The refuge is bordered on the south by the Little Red River. Bald Knob NWR is near the  Henry Gray/Hurricane Lake State Wildlife Management Area

Wildlife

The refuge provides a protected habitat for migratory waterfowl, other birds, and endangered species
12,900 acres of the refuge is a former rice farm with extensive irrigation systems  This is used to grow rice, soybeans, maize, and millet with emphasis on providing food and habitat for migratory waterfowl.  The irrigation system is also utilized to provide habitat for wading birds, mudflats for shorebirds, and to simulate natural flooding of hardwood forests.

Bald Knob National Wildlife Refuge is part of the most important wintering area for ducks in North America. It is especially important as a wintering and stopover point for migrating pintail ducks of which more than 200,000 have been recorded on a single day. Bald Knob hosts the largest winter population of pintails in Arkansas.  Other winter waterfowl species include mallards, blue-winged teal, wood ducks, Canada geese and white-fronted and lesser snow geese. Agricultural land, river sloughs and brakes, bottomland hardwoods and fallow fields provide a diverse habitat that nurtures wintering waterfowl.  Bald eagles are common during winter months. Bird watching is popular.  Hunting for ducks and geese is permitted under regulation by the refuge.  White-tailed deer, rabbit, and squirrel may be hunted in the reforestation areas. Access to most of the refuge is by all-terrain vehicle trails or on foot. Other mammal species that inhabit this refuge are raccoon, bobcat, coyote, river otter and beaver.

The refuge attracts 40,000 visitors per year (2014).  Only day use is permitted. Some areas are closed to visitors to protect wildlife and habitat.

References 

National Wildlife Refuges in Arkansas
Protected areas of White County, Arkansas
Protected areas established in 1993
1993 establishments in Arkansas
Wetlands of Arkansas
Landforms of White County, Arkansas
Little Red River (Arkansas)